Mean survival may refer to:
Mean survival rate in percentage
Mean survival time in e.g. years